The 2013–14 1. FC Köln season was the 65th season in club history.

Background

Peter Stöger was appointed the new head coach of 1. FC Köln on 11 June.

Transfers

In

Out

2. Bundesliga

2. Bundesliga review

Matchdays 1 – 17

Köln 2013–14 started on 20 July against Dynamo Dresden. The match ended in a 1–1 draw. Anthony Ujah scored for Köln and Tobias Kempe scored for Dynamo Dresden. Köln ended the matchday tied for eighth in the league table with Dynamo Dresden. Then Köln ended July with matchday two against Fortuna Düsseldorf on 28 July. The match ended in a 1–1 draw. Anthony Ujah scored for Köln and Charlison Benschop scored for Fortuna Düsseldorf. Köln finished July tied with Dynamo Dresden for tenth place in the table. Köln started August with matchday three Paderborn 07 on 10 August. The match ended in a 1–1 draw. Kacper Przybylko scored for Köln and Markus Krösche scored for Paderborn. Köln finished the matchday in 13th place. Köln faced SV Sandhausen on matchday four on 17 August. Köln won 2–0 with two goals from Marcel Risse. Köln finished the matchday tied for seventh with FSV Frankfurt in the table. Köln finished August with matchday five against Greuther Fürth on 24 August. The match ended in a 0–0. Köln finished August in 10th place. Köln started September with a matchday six against Erzgebirge Aue on 1 September. Köln won the match 4–1. Yannick Gerhardt, Marcel Risse, and Sławomir Peszko scored for Köln. Marcel Risse scored two goals. Taku Ishihara scored for Erzgebirge Aue. Köln finished the matchday in third place. Köln faced Energie Cottbus on matchday seven on 16 September. Köln won 4–0. Patrick Helmes, Anthony Ujah, and Sławomir Peszko scored for Köln. Anthony Ujah scored two goals. Köln finished the matchday in third place. Köln faced 1. FC Kaiserslautern on matchday eight on 20 September. The match ended in a 0–0 draw. Köln finished the matchday in second place. Köln finished September with matchday nine against VfR Aalen on 27 September. Köln won 1–0 with a goal from Marcel Risse. Köln finished September in second place. Köln started October with matchday 10 against Karlsruher SC on 5 October. Köln won 2–1. Patrick Helmes and Mišo Brečko scored for Köln. Koen van der Biezen scored for Karlsruhe. Köln finished the matchday in first place. Köln faced 1860 München on matchday 11 on 21 October. The match ended in a 0–0 draw. Köln finished the matchday in first place. Köln finished October with matchday 12 against Arminia Bielefeld on 25 October. Köln won 1–0 with a goal from Sławomir Peszko. Köln finished the matchday in first place. Köln started November with matchday 13 against Union Berlin on 4 November. Köln won 4–0 with goals from Marcel Risse, Yannick Gerhardt, and Jonas Hector. Marcel Risse scored two goals. Köln finished the matchday in first place. Köln faced VfL Bochum on matchday 14 on 10 November. Bochum won 1–0 with a goal from Richard Sukuta-Pasu. Köln finished the matchday in first place. Köln faced Ingolstadt 04 on matchday 15 on 23 November. Ingolstadt won 1–0 with a goal from Moritz Hartmann. Köln finished the matchday in second place. Köln finished November with matchday 16 against FC St. Pauli on 29 November. Köln won 3–0 with goals from Kevin Wimmer, Patrick Helmes, and Yannick Gerhardt. Köln finished the matchday in first place. Köln started December with matchday 17 against FSV Frankfurt on 7 December. Köln won 2–0 with goals from Anthony Ujah and Marcel Risse. Köln finished the matchday and the first–half of the season in first place.

Matchdays 18 – 34

League fixtures and results

League table

Results summary

DFB–Pokal

DFB–Pokal review
The draw for the first round of the DFB-Pokal happened on 15 June. Köln were drawn against Eintracht Trier. The match happened on 3 August. Köln won 2–0 with goals from Marcel Risse and Maxi Thiel. Then Köln were drawn against Mainz 05 on 10 August The match took place on 24 September. Köln won 1–0 with a goal from Marcel Risse. Köln were drawn againsat Hamburger SV in the draw for the third round. The match took place on 3 December. Hamburg won 2–1 and knocked Köln out of the cup. Adam Matuszczyk scored for Köln. Maximilian Beister and Ivo Iličević scored for Hamburg.

DFB–Pokal results

Legend

DFB–Pokal results

Player information

Squad and statistics

Squad, appearances, and goals

Minutes played

Discipline

References

Koln
1. FC Köln seasons